The Woody Woodpecker and Friends Classic Cartoon Collection is a three-disc DVD collection of theatrical cartoons produced by Walter Lantz Productions for Universal Pictures between 1940 and 1956. The set was released by Universal Studios Home Entertainment on July 24, 2007, and marks the first time a collection of cartoons starring Woody Woodpecker and the other Lantz characters have been widely available on home video (a previous fifteen-volume collection of Woody Woodpecker Show DVDs was made available for mail order through Columbia House in the early 2000s).

Included in the set are 75 cartoon shorts, including the first 45 Woody Woodpecker cartoons, in production order. The other thirty cartoons include five Andy Panda shorts, five Chilly Willy shorts,  five Oswald the Lucky Rabbit shorts, five Swing Symphonies, and ten one-shot Cartune Classics.

A second collection was issued in 2008.

DVD contents

Disc one
 Woody Woodpecker
01 Knock Knock  11/25/40
02 Woody Woodpecker   7/7/41
03 The Screwdriver   8/24/41
04 Pantry Panic   11/24/41
05 The Hollywood Matador   2/9/42
06 Ace in the Hole   6/22/42
07 The Loan Stranger   10/19/42
08 The Screwball   2/15/43
09 The Dizzy Acrobat   5/31/43
10 Ration Bored   7/26/43
11 The Barber of Seville   4/10/44
12 The Beach Nut   10/16/44
13 Ski for Two   11/13/44
14 Chew-Chew Baby   2/5/45
15 Woody Dines Out   5/14/45
Oswald the Lucky Rabbit
Hells Heels   6/2/30
Spooks   7/14/30
Grandma's Pet   1/18/32
Confidence   7/31/33
The Merry Old Soul   11/27/33
Cartune Classics
King Klunk   9/4/33
Toyland Premiere   12/10/34
Hollywood Bowl   10/5/38
Scrambled Eggs   11/20/39
Hysterical Highspots in American History   3/31/41
Bonus features:
1982 documentary short: Walter, Woody and the World of Animation
Vintage 1932 documentary short: Cartoonland Mysteries

Disc two
Woody Woodpecker
16 The Dippy Diplomat   8/27/45
17 The Loose Nut   12/7/45
18 Who's Cookin' Who?   6/27/46
19 Bathing Buddies   7/1/46
20 The Reckless Driver   8/26/46
21 Fair Weather Fiends   11/18/46
22 Musical Moments from Chopin   2/24/47
23 Smoked Hams   4/28/47
24 The Coo Coo Bird   6/9/47
25 Well Oiled   6/30/47
26 Solid Ivory   8/25/47
27 Woody the Giant Killer   12/15/47
28 The Mad Hatter   2/16/48
29 Banquet Busters   3/3/48
30 Wacky-Bye Baby   5/2/48
Andy Panda
Life Begins for Andy Panda   9/9/39
Fish Fry   6/19/44
Apple Andy   5/20/46
The Bandmaster   12/22/47
Scrappy Birthday   2/11/49
Swing Symphonies
$21 a Day (Once a Month)   12/1/41
Pass the Biscuits, Mirandy!   8/23/43
The Greatest Man in Siam   3/27/44
Abou Ben Boogie   9/18/44
The Pied Piper of Basin Street   1/15/45
Bonus features:
Six behind-the-scenes segments produced for The Woody Woodpecker Show

Disc three
Woody Woodpecker
31 Wet Blanket Policy  8/27/48
32 Wild and Woody!  12/31/48
33 Drooler's Delight  3/25/49
34 Puny Express  1/22/51
35 Sleep Happy  3/26/51
36 Wicket Wacky  5/28/51
37 Slingshot 6 7/8  -7/28/51-
38 The Redwood Sap  10/1/51
39 The Woody Woodpecker Polka  10/29/51
40 Destination Meatball  12/24/51
41 Born to Peck  2/25/52
42 Stage Hoax  4/21/52
43 Woodpecker in the Rough  6/16/52
44 Scalp Treatment  9/18/52
45 The Great Who-Dood-It  10/20/52
Chilly Willy
Chilly Willy  12/21/53
I'm Cold  12/20/54
The Legend of Rockabye Point  4/11/55
Hot and Cold Penguin  10/24/55
Room and Wrath  6/4/56
Cartune Classics
Boogie Woogie Bugle Boy of Company "B"  9/1/41
Mother Goose on the Loose  4/13/42
Pigeon Patrol  8/3/42
Crazy Mixed Up Pup  2/14/55
Sh-h-h-h-h-h  6/6/55
Bonus feature:
The Woody Woodpecker Show: Spook-a-Nanny: A complete 1964 episode of The Woody Woodpecker Show, featuring Under the Counter Spy (Woody Woodpecker), Playful Pelican (Andy Panda), and Spook-a-Nanny, the only original Woody Woodpecker cartoon created for the series

References 
Official DVD website

Woody Woodpecker